Andreas Kipar (born 19 May 1960, in Gelsenkirchen) is a German landscape architect and lecturer in landscape architecture.

Career 
Following a gardener's apprenticeship from 1980 to 1984 Kipar studied landscape gardening at the University of GHS Essen (now the University of Duisburg-Essen) and from 1989 to 1994 architecture at the Milan Polytechnic (TU Milan). In 1990 he founded in Milan together with the agronomist Giovanni Sala, the international architecture and planning office LAND (acronym of "Landscape Architecture Nature Development"), which he heads today. LAND manages worldwide projects from Italy (Milan) with branches in Germany (Düsseldorf) and Switzerland (Lugano). From 1998 to 2009 Kipar taught landscape architecture at the University of Genoa. Since 2009, he has been teaching Public Space Design  at the Milan Polytechnic. Guest lectures have taken him to universities and colleges in Italy, Germany, France and the USA. Kipar is married to an Italian (2 children) and his life centres on Milan.

Awards (selection) 
 International ELCA Trend Award "Building with Green" of the European Landscape Contractors Association 2002 (for Rimini Fair outdoor facilities);
 North Rhine-Westphalian Landscape Architecture Award 2006 (for Stadtpark Krefeld-Fischeln);
 Landscape Prize Regione Sardinia 2008/2009 (for open space concept Cagliari/landscape planning municipality Assemini);
 Russian Award in Landscape Architecture 2015;
 German-Italian business award (special award) 2018 (for German-Italian cooperation in the field of environment/green city) 
 MIPIM Award 2018 (for Porta Nuova Best Urban Regeneration Project);

In addition, in 2007 Kipar was awarded the Order of Merit of the Federal Republic of Germany.

Projects (selection) 
 Northpark (Parco Nord), Milan 1985 - 2000
 Open space design Bicocca, Milan 1994-2010
 Portello Park (Ex Alfa Romeo), Milan 1997 - today
 Master Plan Green Rays, Milan 2005 - today
 Krupp Park "Five Hills", Essen 2006 -2011
 Masterplan IFC, Smart City, Moscow 2014 - today
 Masterplan Venice Green Tree, Porto Marghera 2014 -2015
 Landscaping Expo Dubai 2020, Dubai 2015 - today
 Airolo Valley Renaturation, Canton Ticino, 2017 - today
 MIND Milan Innovation District, Milan, 2017 - today
 International Horticultural Exhibition 2019, Beijing 2018 - today

(A detailed list can be found on the homepage of LAND srl).

Publications (short list) 
 Emscher Park, Ruhr basin. A project of environmental restructuring for the international expo (IBA), Il Pomerio, Lodi 1993;
 Il giardino paesaggistico tra 700 e 800 in Italia e in Germania (together with Pier Fausto Bagatti Valsecchi), Guerini e Associati, Milan 1996;
 Architetture del Paesaggio - Ideas and competitions - L’Architettura del Paesaggio attraverso un racconto di concorsi, idee e progetti, Il Verde Editoriale, Milan 2003.

Also published about him: Alessandra Coppa /Giuseppe Marioni: Andreas Kipar Una monografia, Milan 2015.

External links 
https://www.landsrl.com/

Individual mentions 
1. Land Team Germany. Portal Landscape Architecture today (Association of German Landscape Artists). Downloaded on 3 November 2018

2. Du must mal raus/You have to get out post blog Cluverius 8. July 2018. Downloaded on 5. November 2018

3. Curriculum Vitae 2016 Milan Polytechnic. Downloaded 3 November 2018

4. Henning Klüver: Der Vordenker/The Forward Thinker In: Süddeutsche Zeitung, 3 July 2018. Downloaded 3 November 2018

5. Report of the NRW Architecture Chamber (6. March 2007). [1] Downloaded on 7. November 2018

6. Regione Sardegna, Assessorato Urbanistica, Determinazione 2820 / DG (22. December 2009). Downloaded on 2 November 2018

7. Mercurio eV Press release (6. July 2018). Downloaded on 3. November 2018

8. MIPIM Awards 2018 (15. March 2018. Downloaded on 4. November 2018

9. SMOwn Publishing Scientific book publisher since 2011. Downloaded on 3. November 2018

References 

1960 births
20th-century German architects
People from Gelsenkirchen
University of Duisburg-Essen alumni
21st-century German architects
Living people
German expatriates in Italy
Architects from Milan
German landscape architects
Recipients of the Cross of the Order of Merit of the Federal Republic of Germany